Klettermaxe may refer to:
 Klettermaxe (1927 film), directed by Willy Reiber
 Klettermaxe (1952 film), directed by Kurt Hoffmann